Kailashey Kelenkari may refer to:
 Kailashey Kelenkari (novel), a 1973 novel by Satyajit Ray
 Kailashey Kelenkari (film), a 2007 film directed by Sandip Ray, based on the novel